Ovenna hailesellassiei is a moth of the subfamily Arctiinae. It was described by Sven Jorgen R. Birket-Smith in 1965. It is found in Ethiopia.

References

Endemic fauna of Ethiopia
Lithosiini
Moths described in 1965